São Paio may refer to the following places in Portugal:

São Paio (Arcos de Valdevez), a parish in the municipality of Arcos de Valdevez
São Paio (Gouveia), a parish in the municipality of Gouveia 
São Paio (Guimarães), a parish in the municipality of Guimarães
São Paio (Melgaço), a parish in the municipality of Melgaço 
São Paio de Oleiros, a parish in the municipality of Santa Maria da Feira